The Porsche 908 was a racing car from Porsche, introduced in 1968 to continue the Porsche 906-Porsche 910-Porsche 907 series of models designed by Helmuth Bott (chassis) and Hans Mezger (engine) under the leadership of racing chief Ferdinand Piëch.

As the FIA had announced rule changes for Group 6 prototype-sports cars limiting engine displacement to 3,000 cc, as in Formula One, Porsche designed the 908 as the first Porsche sports car to have an engine with the maximum size allowed. The previous Porsche 907 only had a 2,200 cc Type 771/1 flat-eight engine developing 270 hp. The new 3-litre Type 908 flat-eight produced 257 kW (350 hp) at 8,400 rpm.

The 908 originally was a closed coupe to provide low drag at fast tracks, but from 1969 on was mainly raced as the 908/2, a lighter open spyder. A more compact 908/3 was introduced in 1970 to complement the heavy Porsche 917 on twisty tracks that favored nimble cars, like Targa Florio and Nürburgring. Sold off to privateers for 1972, various 908s were entered until the early 1980s, often retro-fitted with Porsche 934-based 2.1-litre turbocharged flat-six engines.

1968: 908/01 
Despite winning the 1000km Nürburgring, the 908 was anything but convincing in 1968. The older and smaller 2200 cc 907 had started the season with dominating wins and later delivered better results than Porsche's first serious attempt in the prototype category. Meanwhile, the older 4.7-litre Ford GT40s Group 5 sports cars were winning races on the faster tracks, while the Ford P68 being a failure, Ferrari remaining absent, and the Alfa Romeo 33 still utilizing a 2,000cc engine. With the minimum production requirement for the 5,000cc Group 5 sports car category reduced from 50 units to 25 for 1969, Porsche decided to go one step further and build the required 25 examples of a new 12-cylinder car, the Porsche 917. This risky investment was expected take about a year, though, and the 908 was supposed to deliver results in the meantime.

The 1968 24 Hours of Le Mans was postponed from June to the end of September due to political unrest in France, setting the stage for a showdown between the 908s and the GT40s. The Porsche 908 LHs (long tails) were the fastest in qualifying and the early stages of the race, but it showed that Porsche had not taken advantage of the additional time to improve the 908. Troubles with the alternator caused delays and even disqualifications as the new Porsche team leaders had misinterpreted the repair rules. Once again, a V8-powered Ford won, and a 907 LT came in second in front of the sole surviving standard 908. In addition, Ford won the 1968 International Championship for Makes.

1969: 908/02 

Aluminium tube frames were used, with air pressure gauges to check them.

The 1969 24 Hours of Daytona was a disaster for Porsche, as all three 908/02 failed, while a Lola T70 won. At the 12 Hours of Sebring, a Ford GT40 defeated a trio of factory-entered 908/2s.

At that time, the more powerful Porsche 917 was introduced in Geneva, and it seemed that the career of the 908 was over, but the 908 started to succeed. The next race was the BOAC 500 at Brands Hatch, where the 908 was finally successful, finishing 1-2-3 ahead of a Ferrari 312P. With additional wins at the 1000km Monza, the Targa Florio, the 1000km Spa and an overwhelming 1-2-3-4-5 at the 1000 km Nürburgring, the 1969 International Championship for Makes was secured for Porsche by the 908/02, while the Porsche 917 suffered problems.

However, the prestigious 24 hours of Le Mans was again won by a Ford GT40 in 1969, as the 917s had gearbox troubles after leading for many hours. A 908 challenged for the win, as Hans Herrmann came in as a very close second, behind Jacky Ickx. Herrmann's 908 low drag coupé was fast on the straights, but near the race's end the brake pads wore down, indicated by a light that was introduced with the 908s. The team gambled on not changing the pads, which allowed Ickx to pass under braking.

1970 - 1971: 908/03

Despite the more powerful 917 improving towards the end of 1969, the career of the 908 continued. On rather twisty and slow tracks like Nürburgring and Targa Florio, the 917 was not suited well even after being modified to the "917K". So rather than trying to make "one size fit all", Porsche built dedicated cars for each type of racing track. Based upon the lightweight and short Porsche 909 which was used in hillclimbing, the new open cockpit version, the 908/03, was even shorter than the 908/02, and only weighed 500 kg (1,100 lb)- an astonishing figure for a long-distance racing car- in comparison, the 917K weighed about 840 kg (1,900 lb). The 908/02 in which Steve McQueen finished second at the 1970 12 Hours of Sebring was also used as a camera car for the Le Mans film in the race itself. McQueen originally intended to drive a Porsche 917 in the race, though this was vetoed by the studio funding the film.

In 1971, vertical fins were added to the rear of the 908s which were beaten at the Targa by Alfa Romeo and their Tipo 33s. All entered 908/03s crashed (two on the first lap; Brian Redman was badly injured after crashing), but Vic Elford had managed to set fastest lap. The next race at the Nürburgring saw a 1-2-3 finish for the 908 in front of two Alfas, but with Alfa scoring wins at Brands Hatch and Watkins Glen, it was proven that these prototypes could beat the 917s.

With the combination of the powerful 917 and the lightweight 908, Porsche dominated the International Championship for Makes each year from 1969 to 1971.

1972 - 1981 

For 1972, the 5,000 cc Group 5 sports car category was discontinued, and the 917 and its main rival, the Ferrari 512, became obsolete. The new rules required a much higher weight than Porsche could achieve (well under ), giving the advantage to the Ferrari 312PB, Alfa Romeo T33TT and Matra with their more powerful F1-derived engines that had  or more, even in endurance trim.

Porsche decided to end its 20-year history of factory sports car racing and sold the 908/03 cars to customers. Besides developing the 917/10 turbo for the Can Am series, the Zuffenhausen-based company focused on the development of the already aging Porsche 911, testing the 911 flat-six with turbochargers. Yet a three-year-old Porsche 908LH coupé was entered by Reinhold Joest in the 1972 24 Hours of Le Mans, finishing third. Customers continued to race several 908/3s, fitted with extra weight as required by the rules. In 1975, some 908s were fitted with turbocharged engines, similar to those used in the Porsche 934 GT car. Even with 2.1-litre and a turbo factor of 1.4, the turbos by now outpowered normally aspirated 3-litre engines. Taking advantage of that, in 1976 the factory developed the Porsche 936  to compete in the new Group 6 two-seater racing car category that replaced the Group 5 sports car class. Unlike the 934 and 935, Porsche did not offer the 936 for sale, entering it in a few races only, mostly at Le Mans.  Several customer-908s were upgraded with 936-style bodywork. The Porsche 908/80 turbo of Joest and Ickx, which finished second in the 1980 24 Hours of Le Mans, turned out later to have a real Porsche 936 chassis.

The 908 won the 1000km Nürburgring in three different decades, winning four years in a row from 1968 to 1971 and again in 1980, utilizing turbocharging for its final victory. Some 908s are still raced currently in competitions such as the Classic Endurance Racing (CER) series.

Versions

908 LH coupé 1968 
 2,990 cc 8-cyl engine
 
 Top speed: 
 Closed cockpit
 Long tail bodywork for fast tracks

908/2 spyder 1969 
 2,990 cc 8-cyl engine
 
 Top speed: 
 Open cockpit
 Low weight (no minimum weight given by rules)
 Long tail bodywork for fast tracks

908/3 spyder 1970-1971 
 2,990 cc 8-cyl engine
 
 Top speed: 
 Open cockpit
 Shorter wheelbase
 Lower weight
 New bodywork, also with rear fins in 1971

908/3 Spyder turbo 1975-1981 
 1971 factory cars sold to customer teams
 Modified by teams and in factory
 2,140 cc 6-cyl turbo engines
 Over 500 hp

References

External links 

 History of the Porsche 908-01, 908-02, 908-03

Sports cars
Sports prototypes
Cars powered by boxer engines
24 Hours of Le Mans race cars
908